Thomas Barton (1730?–1780) was an American divine.

Life 
Barton was a native of Ireland, but descended from an English family that settled there in the reign of Charles I. After graduating from Dublin University he emigrated to America, and in 1751 opened a school at Norristown, Pennsylvania, around the age of 21. He was for some time tutor at the academy (now university) at Philadelphia. In 1753, Barton married Esther Rittenhouse, the daughter of a neighbouring farmer, and sister of David Rittenhouse, the distinguished mathematician and astronomer, whose close friendship he enjoyed until his death.

In 1754, Barton went to England, where he received episcopal orders. He returned to America as a missionary of the Society for the Propagation of the Gospel, with which he remained connected until 1759. He accompanied, as chaplain, the expedition to Fort du Quesne (now Pittsburgh), which ended in the defeat and death of its leader, General Braddock. On leaving York County, Pennsylvania, he settled at Lancaster as rector of St. James's. Here he remained nearly twenty years, dividing his time between the duties of his office and the pursuit of natural history. He was elected to the revived American Philosophical Society in 1768. At last his adherence to the royalist party compelled him to quit his post, and he removed to New York, where he died, 25 May 1780, aged 50. His wife died before him on 18 June 1774. Benjamin Smith Barton, the American physician and naturalist, was one of his children.

Notes

References

External links

1730 births
1780 deaths
Irish people of English descent
18th-century Irish educators
Irish chaplains
Christian chaplains
Alumni of Trinity College Dublin
Irish educators
Irish emigrants to the United States (before 1923)
18th-century American educators